The Lightning is an American sailing dinghy that was designed by Olin Stephens of Sparkman & Stephens, as a one-design racer and first built in 1938.

An accepted World Sailing class, the boat is one of the most popular one-design sailing classes in the United States and is also raced in several other countries.

The design was developed into a smaller boat, as a trainer for the Lightning, the Blue Jay in 1947.

Production
The design has been built by a large number of manufacturers in the United States and also in Canada. There have been 15,550 boats completed and it remains in production by the Allen Boat Company.

In the past it has been built in the US by the Clark Boat Company, Lippincott Boat Works, Nickels Boat Works, Jack A. Helms Co., Lockley Newport Boats, Skaneateles Boat & Canoe, Mobjack Manufacturing, Siddons & Sindle, Loftland Sail-craft, the Eichenlaub Boat Co and WindRider LLC. It was also built in Canada by J.J. Taylor and Sons Ltd.

Boats have been delivered complete, sold as kits for amateur construction and also amateur-built from plans.

Design

The Lightning is a recreational sailboat, initially built with wooden plank construction and, since the early 1960s, of fiberglass with wood trim. It has a fractional sloop rig with wooden or aluminum spars. The rig employs a backstay, anchored off center, so as to not impede the tiller. If equipped with a wooden mast it has a jumper stay from the mast head to the spreaders. The hull has a foredeck, with a "V" shaped coaming, a raked stem, an angled transom, a transom-hung rudder controlled by a tiller and a retractable centerboard.

For sailing the design is equipped with a  spinnaker. Mainsail and jib windows are optional for improved visibility and safety.

The design has a Portsmouth Yardstick racing average handicap of 88.4 and is normally raced with a crew of three sailors, although it can accommodate six adults.

Operational history
The boat has an active class club that regulates the design and organizes races, the International Lightning Class Association. By 1994 there were more than 460 racing fleets in Canada, Europe, South America and the United States.

In a 1994 review Richard Sherwood noted that the design has good freeboard and stability.

Racing

See also
List of sailing boat types

Related development
Blue Jay (dinghy)

References

External links

Allen Boat Company official website
Windrider official Lightning archives on Archive.org

Dinghies
1930s sailboat type designs
 
Classes of World Sailing
Sailboat type designs by Olin Stephens
Sailboat types built by Allen Boat Company
Sailboat types built by Clark Boat Company
Sailboat types built by Lockley Newport Boats
Sailboat types built by Siddons & Sindle
Sailboat types built by WindRider LLC
Sailboat types built by Mobjack Manufacturing
Sailboat types built by Nickels Boat Works
Sailboat types built by Skaneateles Boat & Canoe Co.
Sailboat types built by Lippincott Boat Works
Sailboat types built by Jack A. Helms Co.
Sailboat types built by J.J. Taylor and Sons
Sailboat types built by Loftland Sail-craft
Sailboat types built by Eichenlaub Boat Co.